Cheltenham (also known as Cheltenham–79th Street) is a station on the Hyde Park/South Chicago branch of the Metra Electric Line. , Cheltenham is the 213th busiest of Metra's 236 non-downtown stations, with an average of 47 weekday boardings.

West of this station is another Metra Electric station along 79th Street known as 79th Street (Chatham) along the Main Branch. Street-side parking is available only on Cheltenham Place, which also intersects with 79th Street and Northbound Exchange Avenue. The station was recently renovated in 2008 as part of Metra's redevelopment program for the South Chicago branch.

According to a 2014 study commissioned by the Regional Transportation Authority, the Cheltenham station is an urban neighborhood station. The surrounding area of such stations is predominantly residential with greater density and some commercial near the station.

Bus connections
CTA
  79 79th (Owl Service)

References

External links

79th Street entrance from Google Maps Street View

Cheltenham (79th Street)